The Definitive Biography of P.D.Q. Bach (1807–1742)? is a book by Prof. Peter Schickele chronicling the life of fictitious composer P. D. Q. Bach.

Table of Contents
 Dedication
 Preface
 Preface to the English Language Edition
 Foreword
 Introduction
 Author's Note
 Acknowledgements
 Table of Contents
 I. P.D.Q. Bach's Background: Cause or Effect?
 Early Infancy (1742–1745)
 Late Infancy (1745–1766)
 The Lost Years (1766–1777)
 The Turning Point (1777)
 II. The World of P.D.Q. Bach: A Pictorial Essay
 III. Man or Myth?: In Search of P.D.Q. Bach
 IV. "Such a Horrid Clang": An Annotated Catalogue of the Music of P.D.Q. Bach
 The Initial Plunge
 The Soused Period
 Contrition
 Undiscovered Works
 Appendices
 A. A Map of P.D.Q. Bach's Travels
 B. A Map of P.D.Q. Bach's Public Performances
 C. Charles Burney's Account of His Visit to Wein-am-Rhein in 1788
 D. Bibliography
 E. Analysis of the Two-Part Contraption
 F. Discography
 G. Glossary of Unusual Instruments Used by P.D.Q. Bach
 H. The Bach Family Tree
 Index

Publication history
 1976, US, Random House, Pub date April 1976, Hardcover
 1977, US, Random House, Pub date 12 August 1977, Paperback
 1996, US, Highbridge Audio, Pub date 1 June 1996, Audiobook

External links
 The Peter Schickele/P.D.Q. Bach Homepage

P. D. Q. Bach
1976 books
Comedy books